Bani Asad is a sub-district located in Hazm al-'Udayn District, Ibb Governorate, Yemen. Bani Asad had a population of 4805 according to the 2004 census.

References 

Sub-districts in Hazm al-'Udayn District